Iron County is the name of four counties in the United States:

Iron County, Michigan 
Iron County, Missouri 
Iron County, Utah 
Iron County, Wisconsin